Mandurama is a village in the Blayney Shire, New South Wales, Australia.

Geography 

History 
The site of the village and surrounding areas was home to the Wiradjuri people prior to settlement, and the name "Mandurama" is derived from their word for 'water holes'.

A prominent pastoralist, Thomas Icely, came to the colony in 1820 as a trader. In 1823 he received a land grant of 800 hectares (2000 acres) at Saltram, in the Bathurst area. By 1831 Icely owned Coombing Park, and went on building up his acreage by purchase and further grant. By 1836 there were thirty convicts assigned to Icely's property and in September 1836 he asked the authorities for three more. Within a year he had 62 convicts at work at Coombing, assisting in the cultivation of 120 hectares (290 acres) and running sheep and cattle under two free overseers and was seeking five more convicts, but in 1839 the number had declined to fourteen in post, with a request for nine new assignees. About 1870 part of Coombing Park (under the management of Thomas Icely's eldest son, Thomas Rothery Icely) was sold to John Fagan who named his station Sunny Ridge. The 60,000 Sunny Ridge property originally included the Mandurama town site.

Mandurama was established in 1876 as a privately owned village for the workers of Thomas Icely's Coombing Park. A Post Office opened in 1876, followed by a school in 1877. Mandurama has since developed, along with nearby Lyndhurst into a modest service centre for the surrounding localities and farmland.

The Royal Hotel was established 1899.

Heritage listings 
Mandurama has a number of heritage-listed sites, including:
 1521 Belubula Way: Cliefden
 Cliefden Caves

Mandurama was also the central subject of the group of photographs known as the Mandurama Collection, now housed at the National Library of Australia.

Amenities 

Mandurama has a general store and cafe; service station; a New South Wales Rural Fire Service station; primary school; number of churches; golf club; tennis court; hall, and hotel.

Attractions 
Mandurama retains a number of historic buildings, including two former bank premises, a former primary school, the Lincoln Theatre, and the Belubula Lodge.

See also
 Mandurama Collection

References

External links

 
Towns in New South Wales
Blayney Shire
Blayney–Demondrille railway line